Neil Dimond was a member of the Wisconsin State Assembly during the 1872 session. Other positions he held include Sheriff of Marquette County, Wisconsin. He was a Democrat. Dimond was born on November 20, 1832 in what was then County Londonderry, Ireland.

References

People from County Londonderry
Irish emigrants to the United States (before 1923)
People from Marquette County, Wisconsin
Wisconsin sheriffs
1832 births
Year of death missing
Democratic Party members of the Wisconsin State Assembly